Kaden Elliss (born July 10, 1995) is an American football linebacker for the Atlanta Falcons of the National Football League (NFL). He played college football at Idaho.

Professional career

New Orleans Saints
Elliss was selected by the New Orleans Saints with the 244th overall pick in the seventh round of the 2019 NFL Draft. On September 25, 2019, he was placed on injured reserve with a knee injury.

Elliss was placed on the reserve/COVID-19 list by the team on August 6, 2020, and was activated the next day.

Atlanta Falcons
On March 16, 2023, Elliss signed a three-year, $21.5 million contract with the Atlanta Falcons.

Personal life
Kaden Elliss is one of 12 children of Luther Elliss, a former defensive tackle in the NFL, and Rebecca Elliss.  His brothers, Noah and Christian, both played football at Idaho and currently play in the NFL.

Elliss is a Christian. He has said, “My faith is the most important part of my life. I’m a Christian. I believe in Jesus Christ; that he died and rose from the dead. Honestly, without that, I wouldn’t be who I am. That’s what makes me tick, honestly.”

References

External links
Idaho Vandals bio

1995 births
Living people
Players of American football from Salt Lake City
American football linebackers
Idaho Vandals football players
New Orleans Saints players
Atlanta Falcons players